Jiang Zehan (6 October 1902 – 29 March 1994), also known as Kiang Tsai-han, was a Chinese mathematician and founder of China's topology.

Jiang was a member of the 3rd, 4th, 5th, 6th National Committee of the Chinese People's Political Consultative Conference.

Biography
Jiang was born in Jingde County, Anhui on October 6, 1902, to Jiang Shicai, a businessman. He secondary studied at Nankai School. In 1922 he was accepted to Nankai University, where he studied mathematics under Jiang Lifu. After graduation, he became an assistant in mathematics at Xiamen University. In 1927 he matriculated at Harvard University on a Chinese government scholarship, and studied mathematics under H. M. Morse. In 1930 he became an assistant of Solomon Lefschetz at Princeton University.

Jiang returned to China in 1931 and that year became professor of Mathematics at Peking University. In 1936, he went to the United States for the second time, and studied for one year at the Institute of Advanced Studies, Princeton University. In 1937 he returned to China and taught at National Southwestern Associated University. In 1947 he pursued advanced studies in Switzerland, studying mathematics under H. Hopf. Jiang returned to China on August 8, 1949. After the establishment of the Communist State, he taught at Peking University.

He was elected as an academician of the Chinese Academy of Sciences in 1955. In 1981 he joined the Chinese Communist Party.

On March 29, 1994, he died in Beijing, aged 91.

Papers

References

1902 births
1994 deaths
Educators from Anhui
Harvard University alumni
Mathematicians from Anhui
Members of the Chinese Academy of Sciences
Nankai University alumni
Academic staff of Peking University
People from Xuancheng
People of the Republic of China
Academic staff of Xiamen University